Loser or Losers may refer to:
A person who experiences failure
The unsuccessful social class in winner and loser culture

Film and television
 Loser, a 1996 film directed by Kirk Harris
 Loser (film), a 2000 film starring Jason Biggs and Mena Suvari
 The Losers (2010 film), the film adaptation of the Vertigo comic
 "Loser" (Grounded for Life), a 2001 episode of Grounded for Life
 Losers (2015 film), a 2015 Bulgarian film
 L.O.S.E.R.S., fictional characters featured in The Fairly OddParents
 Losers (TV series), a Netflix television series

Literature and publications
 Loser (novel), a 2002 novel by Jerry Spinelli
 Losers (comics), two comic book teams published by DC Comics
 The Losers (Vertigo), the Vertigo "modernization" of the classic comic
 The Loser, a 1983 novel by Thomas Bernhard

Music
 Losers (band), a British rock band
 Loser (band), an American rock band
 "Loser" (Big Bang song), a 2015 song by Big Bang
 "Loser" (Beck song), a 1993 song by Beck
 "Loser" (3 Doors Down song), a 2000 song by 3 Doors Down from their album The Better Life
 "Loser" (Ayreon song), a 2005 song by Ayreon
 Losers (album), a 1990 album by Sentridoh
 "Loser", a 1972 song by Jerry Garcia and Robert Hunter that appeared on Garcia, and was later covered by Cracker on their album Kerosene Hat
 "Loser", a song by Alma from Have U Seen Her?
 "Loser", a song by Limp Bizkit from Gold Cobra
 "Loser", a song by Jim Martin from Milk and Blood
 "Losers" (The Weeknd song), on the 2015 album Beauty Behind the Madness
 "Losers", a song by The Belle Brigade from The Belle Brigade
 "LOSER / Number Nine", a 2016 single by Kenshi Yonezu.

In other uses
 In contract bridge, a card which will never win a trick
 Loser (hand gesture), a hand gesture made by extending the thumb and index fingers, leaving the other fingers closed to create the letter L, interpreted as "loser", and generally given as a demeaning sign
 Loser (mountain), a mountain in Ausseerland, Styria, Austria
 One of the three peaks in the Leuser Range
 The website Loser.com

See also 
 Lose (disambiguation)
 The Losers (disambiguation)
 Lovable loser, a character archetype
 Losar